Guido Martín Cannetti Álvarez (born December 19, 1979) is an Argentine mixed martial artist who currently competes in the Bantamweight division of the Ultimate Fighting Championship.

Background
Growing up, Guido practised kickboxing and Muay Thai with his brother Bruno, who is also a professional mixed martial artist.

Mixed martial arts career
Guido Cannetti became a professional mixed martial arts fighter in 2007. He won his MMA debut fight by submitting Santiago Terbalca in a Featherweight bout. On his second fight, he defeated Enrique Chimeyo to remain unbeaten. For his next fight, Cannetti moved up to Lightweight division in order to face Cristiano Marcello at the Bitetti Combat 8 event in Brazil. He lost the fight via first-round submission.

Cannetti returned from his loss and entered in a four-fight winning streak by defeating Benjamín Arroyo. He was expected to face up David "Escorpión" Ibérico in a Conviction MMA event to be held in Argentina. On July 7, 2012, the promotion announced that Ibérico withdrew from the fight after suffering a shoulder injury. Cannetti instead faced Jack Guzmán in a bout that marked his return to Featherweight division. He won the fight via first-round knockout. Then he defeated Bellator MMA and WEC veteran Rafael Dias in just 11 seconds in a fight that marked his return to Brazil.

Subsequently, Cannetti tried out for UFC's Latin America developmental program and was accepted into it. As a result, Cannetti moved down to Bantamweight division and begun training at the Jackson's MMA academy at UFC's expense. While in Albuquerque, he defeated Eliazar Rodriguez in a bout that closed his four-fight winning streak before trying out for The Ultimate Fighter in 2014.

The Ultimate Fighter: Latin America
In May 2014, it was revealed that Cannetti was a cast member of The Ultimate Fighter: Latin America, competing for Team Werdum.

Over the course of the show, Cannetti was defeated in the first round of tournament by Marco Beltrán via majority decision after two rounds. Ecuadorian fighter and Team Werdum teammate Marlon Vera was withdrew the tournament after a skin infection and was replaced by Guido Cannetti. Cannetti was defeated by Alejandro Pérez in semi-finals of tournament via first-round knockout.

Ultimate Fighting Championship
Cannetti made his official UFC debut on November 15, 2014 at UFC 180, facing fellow The Ultimate Fighter: Latin America castmate Henry Briones. After being knocked down, he lost the fight via second-round submission. Despite the losing effort, he earned a Fight of the Night bonus.

Cannetti next faced Hugo Viana on August 1, 2015 at UFC 190. He won the fight by unanimous decision.

Cannetti was expected to face former TUF: Latin America opponent Marco Beltrán on November 5, 2016 at The Ultimate Fighter Latin America 3 Finale. However, he was pulled from the card after he was suspended by USADA and was replaced by Joe Soto.

Cannetti was given a 10 month suspension after testing positive for multiple prohibited substances from a contaminated supplement. Cannetti tested positive for ostarine, the stanozolol metabolites 16β-hydroxystanozolol and 4β-hydroxystanozolol, as well as hydrochlorothiazide and chlorothiazide, following an out-of-competition test conducted on October 5, 2016. 

Cannetti faced Kang Kyung-ho on January 14, 2018 at UFC Fight Night: Stephens vs. Choi. He lost the fight via submission in round one.

Cannetti faced Diego Rivas on May 19, 2018 at UFC Fight Night 129. He won the fight by unanimous decision.

Cannetti faced Marlon Vera on November 17, 2018 at UFC Fight Night 140. After being knocked down, he lost the fight via a rear-naked choke submission in round two.

Cannetti faced Danaa Batgerel on March 7, 2020 at UFC 248. He lost the fight via knockout in the first round.

Cannetti was scheduled to face Mario Bautista on August 28, 2021 at UFC on ESPN 30. However, Bautista tested positive for COVID-19 and was pulled from the card,  and he was replaced by Mana Martinez. At the weigh-ins, Martinez weighed in at 140 pounds, four pounds over the bantamweight non-title fight limit. The bout proceeded at a catchweight and he forfeited 30% of his purse to Cannetti. Cannetti lost the fight via split decision.

Cannetti faced Kris Moutinho on March 12, 2022 at UFC Fight Night 203. He won the fight via technical knockout in round one.

Cannetti faced Randy Costa on October 1, 2022 at UFC Fight Night 211. He submitted Costa via rear-naked choke in the first round. This win earned him the Performance of the Night award.

The match between Bautista and Mario Bautista was rescheduled for UFC Fight Night 221 on March 11, 2023. He lost the fight via a rear-naked choke submission in the first round.

Personal life
Cannetti and his wife Carolina have two sons, Francesco (born 2014) and Filipo (2015).

Guido and his brother Bruno co-own and teach at their mixed martial arts gym Our Town MMA in Lanús, Argentina.

Guido idolized Argentine footballer Diego Maradona and said that he mourned and cried after Maradona died in November 2020.

Championships and accomplishments
Ultimate Fighting Championship
Fight of the Night (One time) vs. Henry Briones
Performance of the Night (One time)

Mixed martial arts record

|-->
|-
|Loss
|align=center|10–7
|Mario Bautista
|Submission (rear-naked choke)
|UFC Fight Night: Yan vs. Dvalishvili
|
|align=center|1
|align=center|3:18
|Las Vegas, Nevada, United States
|-->
|-
|Win
|align=center|10–6
|Randy Costa
|Submission (rear-naked choke)
|UFC Fight Night: Dern vs. Yan
|
|align=center|1
|align=center|1:04
|Las Vegas, Nevada, United States
|
|-
|Win
|align=center|9–6
|Kris Moutinho
|TKO (punches)
|UFC Fight Night: Santos vs. Ankalaev
|
|align=center|1
|align=center|2:07
|Las Vegas, Nevada, United States
|
|-
|Loss
|align=center|8–6
|Mana Martinez
|Decision (split)
|UFC on ESPN: Barboza vs. Chikadze
|
|align=center|3
|align=center|5:00
|Las Vegas, Nevada, United States
|
|- 
|Loss
|align=center|8–5
|Danaa Batgerel
|KO (punches)
|UFC 248
|
|align=center|1
|align=center|3:01
|Las Vegas, Nevada, United States
|
|-
|Loss
|align=center|8–4
|Marlon Vera
|Submission (rear-naked choke)
|UFC Fight Night: Magny vs. Ponzinibbio 
|
|align=center|2
|align=center|1:31
|Buenos Aires, Argentina
|
|-
|Win
|align=center|8–3
|Diego Rivas
|Decision (unanimous)
|UFC Fight Night: Maia vs. Usman
|
|align=center|3
|align=center|5:00
|Santiago, Chile
|
|-
|Loss
|align=center|7–3
|Kang Kyung-ho
|Submission (triangle choke)
|UFC Fight Night: Stephens vs. Choi
|
|align=center|1
|align=center|4:53
|St. Louis, Missouri, United States
|
|-
|Win
|align=center|7–2
|Hugo Viana
|Decision (unanimous)
|UFC 190
|
|align=center|3
|align=center|5:00
|Rio de Janeiro, Brazil
|
|-
|Loss
|align=center|6–2
|Henry Briones
|Submission (rear-naked choke)
|UFC 180
|
|align=center|2
|align=center|1:44
|Mexico City, Mexico
|
|-
|Win
|align=center|6–1
|Eliazar Rodriguez
|Submission (rear-naked choke)
|Jackson's MMA Series 11
|
|align=center|1
|align=center|4:29
|Albuquerque, New Mexico, United States
|
|-
|Win
|align=center|5–1
|Rafael Dias
|KO (punches)
|Bitetti Combat 12
|
|align=center|1
|align=center|0:11
|Rio de Janeiro, Brazil
|
|-
|Win
|align=center|4–1
|Jack Guzman
|TKO (punches)
|Conviction MMA 3: Argentina vs. Peru
|
|align=center|1
|align=center|2:46
|Buenos Aires, Argentina
|
|-
|Win
|align=center|3–1
|Benjamin Arroyo
|Submission (rear-naked choke)
|Contest MMA: Argentina vs. Chile
|
|align=center|1
|align=center|1:49
|Buenos Aires, Argentina
|
|-
|Loss
|align=center|2–1
|Cristiano Marcello
|Submission (rear-naked choke) 
|Bitetti Combat 8: 100 Years of Corinthians
|
|align=center|1
|align=center|1:52
|São Paulo, Brazil
|
|-
|Win
|align=center|2–0
|Enrique Chimeyo
|TKO (punches) 
|Sin Piedad: Argentina vs. México
|
|align=center|1
|align=center|3:30
|Buenos Aires, Argentina
|
|-
|Win
|align=center|1–0
|Santiago Terbalca
|Submission (rear-naked choke)
|Real Fights 3: Underground Fights
|
|align=center|1
|align=center|0:00
|Buenos Aires, Argentina
|
|-

References

External links

Living people
1979 births
Sportspeople from Mar del Plata
Argentine male sport wrestlers
Argentine Muay Thai practitioners
Argentine male mixed martial artists
Bantamweight mixed martial artists
Featherweight mixed martial artists
Lightweight mixed martial artists
Mixed martial artists utilizing kickboxing
Mixed martial artists utilizing Muay Thai
Mixed martial arts trainers
Ultimate Fighting Championship male fighters
20th-century Argentine people
21st-century Argentine people